Akmal Anvaruly Bakhtiyarov (born 2 June 1998) is a Kazakhstani football player. He plays for Ordabasy.

Career

Club
Bakhtiyarov made his debut in the Russian Football National League for PFC Sochi on 10 March 2019 in a game against FC Armavir. He made his Russian Premier League debut for Sochi on 26 October 2019, substituting Nikita Burmistrov in the 86th minute of a 0–2 loss to FC Rostov.

In March 2021 he returned to Kazakhstan and signed with Zhetysu. In July 2022 he returned to Kazakhstan and signed with Ordabasy.

Career statistics

Club

References

External links
 
 Profile by Russian Football National League
 

1998 births
People from Talgar
Living people
Kazakhstani footballers
Kazakhstan youth international footballers
Kazakhstan under-21 international footballers
Association football midfielders
FC Kairat players
FC Noah players
PFC Sochi players
FC Zhetysu players
FC Olimp-Dolgoprudny players
FC Ordabasy players
Armenian Premier League players
Russian First League players
Russian Premier League players
Kazakhstan Premier League players
Kazakhstani expatriate footballers
Expatriate footballers in Armenia
Kazakhstani expatriate sportspeople in Armenia
Expatriate footballers in Russia
Kazakhstani expatriate sportspeople in Russia